The Trickster is a moniker used by three DC Comics supervillains, two of which are enemies of the Flash. Both have been members of the Rogues.

Both the James Jesse and Axel Walker incarnations of the character have been substantially adapted into television productions of DC Comics work. Actor Mark Hamill is most closely associated with the role, having played the James Jesse incarnation in two live-action television series and voiced the character in several animated and video game appearances. Devon Graye portrayed the Axel Walker incarnation in The Flash television series.

Creation and publication history
James Jesse first appeared in The Flash #113 (June–July 1960) and was created by John Broome and Carmine Infantino. Infantino originally designed the character for the issue's cover, which was then used as the basis for the issue's plot and the character's history.

Axel Walker debuted in The Flash (vol. 2) #183 (April 2002) and was created by Geoff Johns and Scott Kolins.

Fictional character biography

James Jesse

The original Trickster (real name Giovanni Giuseppe) is the practical joker and con man whose favorite occupation is damaging enemies like the Flash with items such as explosive teddy bears.

His alter ego is "James Jesse". He was a circus acrobat who decided to become a criminal just like his "reverse namesake" Jesse James. He created shoes that allowed him to walk on air to first help him in the trapeze shows his family was in, as every member of his family was a trapeze expert and his father wanted him to be one also, and other dangerous gag gadgets for his crimes. He clashed with the Flash (Barry Allen) many times. In his first appearance, his Harlequin costume causes the Flash to guess he is in a circus, and he captures the Trickster after pogo-sticking to the trapeze.

After Barry Allen's death, the Trickster relocated from Central City to Hollywood, where he spent some time working in special effects. He attempted to steal Dan Cassidy's innovative Blue Devil suit, but was defeated. When Cassidy later became trapped in the suit, Jesse befriended him and relied on Cassidy to help with his sporadic efforts to give up supervillainy.

In the miniseries Underworld Unleashed Neron tried to create Hell on Earth. When James Jesse tricked his way into Neron's domain, it was only to find himself an expected visitor. Neron made vague promises to Jesse, and seemed to keep Jesse in his confidences. However, once Jesse realized he was in Hell and Neron was the devil incarnate, Trickster realized it was up to him to beat the devil. He managed to trick Neron and defeat him with Captain Marvel's help. Upon finding himself back on Earth, Trickster lamented the fact that he had engineered "the greatest sting of all time" and no one had witnessed it...and promptly decided he had better work on the side of the angels, because he did not dare go to Hell.

He began using his con artist skills for good, and collecting the weapons of incarcerated supervillains because such things were too dangerous to be left lying around and could fall into the wrong hands (he was right: see Axel Walker below).

When his old girlfriend Mindy Hong called on him for help, Trickster went with her to the tiny mountain kingdom of Zhutan. There, with the help of the Pied Piper and Billy Hong, a 12-year-old boy who proved to be the Majee (a special agent of the Saravistran god Meshta, sent to observe and weigh humankind's progress), he again defeated Neron. As part of the deal, Jesse told Neron to forget all about the Rogues, who were grudgingly grateful for being rescued from the demon's wrath. Minutes later, Jesse was flabbergasted to be told that Billy Hong was his son.

Trickster returned to the States and kept on using his skills for good. He once saved Catwoman's life by tricking her into helping him "kill" her. She was grateful, and he thought her "the most fascinating woman I've ever met", but they parted as merely friends. The FBI contacted Jesse and recruited him. He worked for them awhile and then the Top reappeared and turned the Rogues' world topsy-turvy by brainwashing several of them, causing the Rogue War. Still working as an agent of the FBI, James Jesse gathered the reformed Rogues to stop Captain Cold and the other Rogues. However, the Top appeared and reverted what he did to the reformed Rogues, eventually. It took Trickster and the Pied Piper a long time to sort out their own memories from the Top's hypnotic suggestions. The other Rogues scattered and laid low.

Countdown

James Jesse appears in Countdown #51, where he arrives at fellow Rogue Heat Wave's apartment in response to Captain Cold's call for a meeting of the Rogues. Heat Wave is not pleased to see Trickster, and reprimands Jesse on the fact that he was once helping the Flash (Wally West). Trickster talks his way into the apartment, and it appears that the Top's brainwashing of Jesse has been completely undone. Unbeknownst to the two former cellmates, as they are discussing the future of the Rogues, one of the Pied Piper's rats is spying on them. Later that evening, Pied Piper rejoins the Rogues as well and resumes an uneasy friendship with Jesse. After Captain Cold, Heat Wave and Weather Wizard murder Bart Allen in Flash: The Fastest Man Alive #13; the resultant chaos sends the Trickster and the Pied Piper on the run from heroes and villains alike.

After attending Bart Allen's funeral in secret, Piper and the Trickster are captured by Deadshot and Multiplex and handcuffed together with cuffs that will explode if they are tampered with, separated by about five feet of equally protected chain. They manage to escape from their captors, but unfortunately they remain shackled together as they continue their lives on the lam. They quickly make their way to Gotham where they are offered partial sanctuary by the Penguin, who contacts the FBI for the reward. The duo then escape the Suicide Squad only to have the Question and Batwoman catch up with them.

Piper and Trickster immediately begin to plead with the two heroes that they personally were not responsible for the death of Bart Allen. Batwoman is quick to ignore their pleas, and more concerned for busting the two criminals for the Flash's death. The Question however, is willing to hear them out, at which point the Trickster performs a puppet show to plead their case, using puppets of himself and the Flash. Batwoman becomes furious at the disrespect that Trickster shows, and punches him down, breaking his nose. The Question however, believes their story, saying that "those two couldn't kill time' and lets them go. When Batwoman demands what right she has to release them, Montoya states that her past as a police detective taught her to spot true murderers.

The two Rogues inadvertently make it to Poison Ivy's greenhouse, and are captured by her. Despite being dazed by Poison Ivy's use of pheromones, Trickster finds himself focusing on Piper once he hears the other man speak. The situation gets even more dangerous when Deathstroke arrives. Trickster draws his attention away from Piper for the second time, and gets his nose broken a second time. Deathstroke beats up both Rogues but does not kill them, deciding to use the two fugitives as bait by planting a bomb on them. They are found by Batman, who gets the third dose of Trickster's insolence, but resists temptation and turns the pair of them over to the Flash (Wally West). West is furious. He hauls Trickster and Piper back to Bart Allen's Grave. They explain that Deathstroke has planted subcutaneous explosive devices in their necks. West believes them and removes the devices by vibrating through their skin. He continues questioning them, and Trickster's answers make him so angry he breaks Jesse's nose for the third time. Eventually, however, he believes their story.

Wally confines the two at the Green Arrow/Black Canary wedding, despite the warnings that Deathstroke is planning an all-out assault at the occasion. The two manage to escape the wedding assault, stealing a car and inadvertently picking up Double Down as a passenger. The trio stop at a diner, only to be attacked by the Suicide Squad. Double Down is captured, but Piper and Trickster decide to follow the Squad using an invisibility field, planning to free the other captured villains, whom Trickster insists will "owe us for life." They encounter and free Two-Face, who tells them that the villains are being shipped off at a secret base, then flips a coin to decide whether or not to go along with them. The duo narrowly escape the resultant mayhem and then once again avoid capture by Deadshot.

Throughout Countdown, Trickster makes a series of less-than-funny homophobic jokes (although he has never used them in any earlier series) which keep the Piper angry and focused. But at the last, when they are riding in the freight car of a train, he is finally able to turn the joke on himself and the two crack up laughing at his awful wordplay.

Unfortunately, just at the moment when Trickster finally addresses the Piper as "Hartley" for the first time in the entire series, Jesse notices the red dot of a laser sight on Piper's forehead. Deadshot has caught up with them again. Trickster yanks the Piper out of the line of fire, saving his life, and then Trickster uncharacteristically decides to make a stand and fight. During the fray, Deadshot grabs Trickster's cape and yanks him from the train, then drags him along the tracks, wounding him. When Deadshot declares he is going to shoot the Pied Piper and takes aim, Trickster shouts, "NO! NOT HIM! NOT NOW!" and hurls himself into the hail of bullets. Jesse is killed instantly, but the Piper is shielded by his body and survives and escapes on the train.

Left alone with the corpse of Trickster still chained to him, Piper is forced to flee the train in the Chihuahuan desert and gets lost, dragging along his dead (but talkative) companion. Unable to destroy the cuffs, Piper eventually chops off Trickster's left hand after carrying his corpse as far as he can. While most of Trickster's body remains on Earth, the hand goes with the Piper through a mysteriously-appearing boomtube to Apokolips.

There, DeSaad breaks away the cuffs, freeing Piper and consigning Trickster's hand to the foul depths of Apokolips. DeSaad then explains that he has been manipulating events and both Rogues all along, because he believes the Piper can express the Anti-Life Equation through his music. Realizing this fiend had murdered Trickster, the Piper lets DeSaad have what he wants-- "voicing" the Anti-Life Equation with his music until DeSaad's head explodes. Then, alone and mourning his murdered friend, the Piper plays a swan song for Trickster, and his music is so furious and powerful that the entire planet explodes.

Once returned to Earth via another Boom Tube he created, the Pied Piper recovers from his nightmare journey and resumes his efforts to take down the Rogues for good. In the miniseries Final Crisis: Rogues' Revenge, he steals Jesse's last will and testament from the authorities. While on the run, Jesse had told him how the document conceals another written in invisible ink, which turns out to be instructions and diagrams showing how to bring down the Rogues. Unfortunately, Piper's efforts to carry out Jesse's plans are unsuccessful: he is wounded and then unwillingly involved in the killing of Inertia.
 
In Blackest Night: The Flash, James Jesse was reanimated as a Black Lantern.

DC Rebirth
He later appears before his successor Axel Walker, after his powers of the Strength Force were removed by the Flash. He manage to capture Commander Cold (a 25th century version of Captain Cold) to find information from him to improve his “latest trick” in Central City.

Axel Walker

While the first Trickster was working for the FBI, teenager Axel Walker stole all of Jesse's gadgets and shoes and became the new Trickster. He joined Blacksmith's Network and destroyed files from Goldface and Hunter Zolomon for her. He was also given new "toys" in addition to Jesse's originals. After the defeat of Blacksmith, he was invited to join the new Rogues led by Captain Cold, and accepted. He remained with the new Rogues until the "reformed" Rogues attempted to stop Cold. While the two Tricksters were fighting, the Top gave Jesse's memory back. The original Trickster then defeated his successor and told him never to become the Trickster again.

After some time, Axel escaped from prison and returned to Keystone City. However, he was quickly defeated by the Flash.

Axel's next appearance since then was in Helmet of Fate: Detective Chimp, where he answered an ad from four college students asking for an experienced superhero to train them. He had dinner with them and then killed all four of them. His crime was discovered when Detective Chimp used his remarkable deductive powers to help deduce who the murderer was. Axel was then arrested.

Final Crisis: Rogues' Revenge
With the "reformed" Trickster dead, Axel returned as the Trickster in Final Crisis: Rogues' Revenge miniseries. Throughout the series Axel was taught what it took to be a true Rogue. When Trickster is told he needs to earn his place in the Rogues, he asks how. Mirror Master responds by telling him "Yeh don't tell Cold why yeh  be here, yeh tell him why yeh  to be here." At the end of the series Trickster participates in the murder of Inertia.

The Flash (vol. 3)
The Trickster and the Rogues visit Sam Scudder's old hideout and unveil a giant mirror with the words In Case of Flash: Break Glass written on it. Afterward, Axel is still on the run with the Rogues. He is seen speeding away in the Trickster Mobile, being chased by the Flash (Barry Allen). The Trickster drives off a cliff and escapes the vehicle, while the Flash takes the car apart in the air.

The New 52
In September 2011, The New 52 rebooted DC's continuity. In this new timeline, Trickster/Axel Walker is reintroduced as a member of the Black Razors, the team responsible for dealing with the Daemonites invasion. He is tasked to work alongside Priscilla Kitaen to take down her clone. He is later seen as a part of Glider's Rogues, and rescued Captain Cold, and attempted to reason with an invading Gorilla Grodd, which led to him losing his right arm. He later was equipped with a robotic arm which essentially functioned like a normal human arm.

DC Rebirth
During DC Rebirth, Axel is later sent to Iron Heights, where he suffers several abuses from Warden Wolfe and eventually the police began building a case with Axel's help to try to put Warden Wolfe away for his abuses at Iron Heights. He is later allowed to leave Iron Heights to be interrogated by some police officers, but Trickster seems uneasy about talking with a judge because Wolfe will come for him. The police give him reassurances, but it does not seem to calm him down. He even seems to be a little ill. However, the judge never arrives, as their meeting is interrupted by two bird people crashing through the window. They are the Para-Angels and they have been hired to make sure Trickster only talks to the right people and apparently the cops are not in that list. The Para-Angels succeed in abducting Trickster and his arm falls off in the struggle. They seem to feel secure, until the Flash jumps from a building to engage them. To get the Flash off of them, the female Para-Angel attempts to kill Trickster by throwing him to the ground below. The Flash is able to save him, but the Angels attempt to get away when suddenly Commander Cold arrives on his hoverbike and freezes both of the Angels, forcing the Flash to act to prevent the female from shattering on the ground. The Flash and Cold start arguing and this gives Trickster the opportunity to flee the scene. He keeps commenting about how he is feeling sick and just as he has gotten away, the ground opens up and swallows him whole. Because of this, Barry loses Trickster and blames Commander Cold for it. Barry is later contacted by Cold and he rushes off to meet him where Trickster disappeared, with Cold explaining that he believes that Trickster was changed by one of the new forces that have been unleashed by Barry and Wally when they broke through the Speed Force. This is when a fist breaks through the ground beneath them. It is Trickster, who has been empowered by the Strength Force. He quickly defeats the Flash and Commander Cold and then sets his sights on Iron Heights and Warden Wolfe.

New God
Another Trickster appears in Batman/Superman as part of the New 52 continuity. A trickster god from Apokolips, Kaiyo is an agent of Darkseid with the power to move between worlds at will. She pursues Batman, Superman, and their counterparts on Earth-2 prior to that world's destruction and is responsible for the first encounter between the Man of Steel and the Dark Knight. Her appearance on Earth-2 leads to Darkseid's discovery of and later siege upon that world, while she also leaves behind a relic which will contribute to the resurrection of Damian Wayne.

During the Forever Evil storyline, the Rogues were in the middle of springing Trickster from prison, only for Johnny Quick to arrive and succeed in freeing all the inmates.

Powers and abilities
The Trickster has a number of trick items that he employs. This includes itching powder, potato head bombs, exploding rubber chickens and yo-yos, sharpened jacks, hard shell candy, and various other joke-themed weapons.

The Trickster wears a pair of shoes that allow him to fly for up to 10 hours.

Other versions

Flashpoint
In the alternate timeline of the Flashpoint event, Axel Walker, known (in this reality) as the Trixter, was imprisoned in Iron Heights; the prisoners forced to shut Trixter up for his jokes. He and the Rogues escape from Iron Heights and he then follows the Mirror Master's Rogues; however, the Rogues did not invite him. The Trixter claims to them that he plans to kidnap Citizen Cold's sister, Lisa Snart. The Trixter pursues revenge on Citizen Cold for murdering the original Trickster. The Rogues, however find out that the Trixter has been working for Citizen Cold all along. The Mirror Master kills him by making him enter his mirrorverse, causing him to die. Axel mentions that Cold has killed the previous Trickster.

25th century Trixster
A futuristic version of the Trixster is a hero and part of the 25th century cops known as the Renegades from Professor Zoom's future.

In other media

Television
 The James Jesse incarnation of the Trickster appears in The Flash (1990), portrayed by Mark Hamill. This version, also known as James Montgomery Jesse, is a wanted criminal psychopath who has committed mass killings in various states and was previously served by a sidekick named Prank. In his self-titled episode, Jesse develops a psychotic obsession with and kidnaps private investigator Megan Lockhart (portrayed by Joyce Hyser), believing she is Prank and that the Flash brainwashed her. Despite successfully countering the speedster several times, Jesse is ultimately apprehended by the Flash with Lockhart's help. In the series finale, "The Trial of the Trickster", Jesse escapes from his trial with help from Zoey Clark (portrayed by Corinne Bohrer), the wealthy owner of Clarx Toys and fan of his who disguised herself as the court stenographer. Arriving at her toy store, Clark reveals she wants to become Prank and seduces Jesse into believing she was always Prank. After kidnapping the Flash and brainwashing him to serve them however, Clark becomes jealous and fears she is being replaced. While helping him escape, the Trickster abandons her, though the pair are ultimately apprehended by the Flash after he regains his memories. In 1995, the two episodes were edited together into a movie and released on VHS as The Flash II: Revenge of the Trickster. Had the show been renewed for a second season, the producers had plans for a team-up episode with Captain Cold and Mirror Master.
 The James Jesse incarnation of the Trickster appears in the Justice League Unlimited episode "Flash and Substance", voiced by Mark Hamill. This version is designed to resemble Hamill's previous portrayal and is depicted as being aware of his psychosis. He attempts to aid Mirror Master, Captain Cold, and Captain Boomerang in their vendetta against the Flash, but they disagree with his outlandish plan and abandon him. Disgruntled by this, Trickster heads to a supervillain bar, where the Flash, Batman, and Orion arrive to interrogate him for information on the speedster's assassins. Batman and Orion attempt to use force, but the Flash takes over and politely convinces Trickster to tell them about Mirror Master, Captain Cold, and Captain Boomerang's plans in exchange for Trickster turning himself in and returning to the hospital.
 Both the James Jesse and the Axel Walker incarnations of the Trickster appear in The Flash (2014), portrayed again by Mark Hamill and Devon Graye respectively. Introduced in the episode "Tricksters", Jesse terrorized Central City twenty years prior before he was imprisoned in Iron Heights Penitentiary. In the present, Walker surfaces as an apparent copycat terrorist. While helping the police apprehend him, Jesse is seemingly appalled that someone "stole" his tricks and equipment, though he later reveals himself as Walker's mentor and father. Walker breaks Jesse out of prison, taking Barry Allen's father Henry as a hostage. They subdue the Flash by attaching a bomb that is rigged to explode should he try to remove it or decelerate to his wrist. However, the Flash learns to phase through objects and safely leave the bomb behind before apprehending both Tricksters. In the episode "The Elongated Knight Rises", Walker is broken out of prison by his mother Zoey Clark / Prank (portrayed again by Corinne Bohrer), who joins him in capturing Cisco Ramon and Caitlin Snow before they are defeated by Ralph Dibny.
 An Earth-3 incarnation of James Jesse / Trickster makes a minor appearance in the episode "The Present", also portrayed by Hamill.
 The James Jesse incarnation of the Trickster appears in the Justice League Action short "Missing the Mark", voiced again by Mark Hamill.
 The James Jesse incarnation of the Trickster appears in the Scooby-Doo and Guess Who? episode "One Minute Mysteries!", voiced again by Mark Hamill.

Film
The Axel Walker incarnation of the Trickster appears in Lego DC Comics Super Heroes: Justice League: Attack of the Legion of Doom, voiced by Mark Hamill.

Video games
 The James Jesse incarnation of the Trickster appears in The Flash (1993).
 The James Jesse incarnation of the Trickster appears in DC Universe Online, voiced by Paul Wensley.
 The Axel Walker incarnation of the Trickster appears as a playable character in Lego Batman 3: Beyond Gotham, voiced by Troy Baker.
 The Axel Walker incarnation of the Trickster appears as a playable character in Lego DC Super-Villains, voiced again by Mark Hamill.

References
Countdown # 51

External links
Arrowverse entry for Trickster
Arrowverse entry for Trickster 2
Alan Kistler's profile on the Flash - A detailed analysis of the history of the Flash by comic book historian Kistler. Covers information all the way from Jay Garrick to Barry Allen to today, as well as discussions on the various villains and rogues who fought the Flash. Various art scans.
Counting Down to Countdown V: Mary Marvel, Trickster, Pied Piper
Crimson Lightning  - An online index to the comic book adventures of the Flash.

Comics characters introduced in 1960
Comics characters introduced in 2002
DC Comics male supervillains
Fictional Federal Bureau of Investigation personnel
DC Comics male superheroes
Villains in animated television series
Fictional con artists
Fictional mass murderers
Fictional serial killers
Fictional tricksters
Characters created by John Broome
Characters created by Carmine Infantino
Characters created by Geoff Johns
Flash (comics) characters